Ernst Moritz Geyger (1861 – 1941) was a German artist known for his work in sculpture, painting and engraving. His work is included in the collections of the Los Angeles County Museum of Art, the Carnegie Museum of Art and the Fine Arts Museums of San Francisco.

Gallery

References

19th-century German male artists
20th-century German male artists